The sixth season of the American sitcom The Big Bang Theory aired on CBS from September 27, 2012 to May 16, 2013. 

The series crossed the 20 million viewer mark for the first time with this season's "The Bakersfield Expedition", which along with NCIS, made CBS the first network to have two scripted series reach that large an audience in the same week since 2007. This success has been attributed to the sitcom's exposure in syndication, its late 2010 move to a new time-slot, and the influence of showrunner Steven Molaro (who took over from Bill Prady) on the characters' storylines.

During the season, Kevin Sussman became a part of the main cast as Stuart Bloom. Mark Cendrowski was nominated for the Directors Guild of America Award for Outstanding Directing – Comedy Series for the season premiere "The Date Night Variable". Jim Parsons won the Primetime Emmy Award for Outstanding Lead Actor in a Comedy Series at the 65th Primetime Emmy Awards for the episode "The Habitation Configuration". Mayim Bialik submitted the episode "The Fish Guts Displacement" for consideration due to her nomination for the Primetime Emmy Award for Outstanding Supporting Actress in a Comedy Series at the 65th Primetime Emmy Awards. Bob Newhart won the Primetime Emmy Award for Outstanding Guest Actor in a Comedy Series at the 65th Primetime Creative Arts Emmy Awards for the episode "The Proton Resurgence".

Cast

Main cast
 Johnny Galecki as Dr. Leonard Hofstadter
 Jim Parsons as Dr. Sheldon Cooper
 Kaley Cuoco as Penny
 Simon Helberg as Howard Wolowitz
 Kunal Nayyar as Dr. Rajesh "Raj" Koothrappali 
 Mayim Bialik as Dr. Amy Farrah Fowler
 Melissa Rauch as Dr. Bernadette Rostenkowski Wolowitz
 Kevin Sussman as Stuart Bloom

Special guest cast
 Howie Mandel as himself
 Buzz Aldrin as himself
 LeVar Burton as himself

Recurring cast
 Carol Ann Susi as Mrs. Wolowitz
 Pasha Lychnikoff as Dimitri Rezinov
 Mike Massimino as himself
 Margo Harshman as Alex Jensen
 Wil Wheaton as himself
 Casey Sander as Mike Rostenkowski
 Regina King as Janine Davis
 John Ross Bowie as Dr. Barry Kripke
 Kate Micucci as Lucy
 Stephen Hawking as himself (voice)
 Brian Posehn as Dr. "Bert" Bertram Kibbler

Guest cast
 Jan Hoag as Lilian
 Ken Lerner as Dr. Schneider
 Janelle Marra as Claire
 Ryan Cartwright as Cole
 Meagen Fay as Mrs. Rostenkowski
 Dakin Matthews as Santa
 Matt Battaglia as Officer Reynolds
 Josh Brener as Dale 
 Briana Cuoco as Gretchen
 Riccardo LeBron as Tom
 Bob Newhart as Dr. Arthur Jeffries/Professor Proton

Production 
The season finale of season 5 depicted Howard Wolowitz traveling to the International Space Station (ISS) on board a Soyuz rocket, and season 6 features him working in the ISS. Thanks to technical consulting from Astronaut Mike Massimino, who also plays himself on the show, the production crew was able to put together sets that realistically depict the Soyuz capsule and the ISS. A small  portion of a chamber that is a model of the ISS was rented and used as the set for the ISS. "Unique camera angles and creative framing" were used to make the set look larger. To simulate weightlessness, the production crew decided to use "long skinny platforms" to support the actors from below, rather than use tethers to suspend from above. The actors were required to act out "motions of microgravity" in order to create "theatrical authenticity".

Episodes

Ratings

Reception 
The sixth season received mixed reviews compared to prior seasons. In regards to sending the Howard Wolowitz character into space, June Thomas of Slate wrote that "The Big Bang Theorys creators deserve praise for their willingness to shake things up. After five incredibly successful seasons of nerdy laughs, it would’ve been easy to coast. Instead, they chose to press the reset button and disrupt the familiar friendships. Still, I hope things settle down soon, because so far this season, it’s all been a bit of a bummer". Oliver Sava of The A.V. Club criticized the character of Wolowitz's mother, writing that "Howard's mom has outlived her usefulness on this series, and rather than an obstacle for the character, she’s become a crutch for the writers to lean on". Jesse Schedeen of IGN criticized the storylines, writing that "The entire episode was pretty much predicated on two jokes ... But those two jokes had enough mileage in them to last a full 22 minutes".

References 

General references

External links

2012 American television seasons
2013 American television seasons
The Big Bang Theory seasons